Vinagarra is a genus of ray-finned fish in the family Cyprinidae endemic to Vietnam.

Species
There are currently 4 recognized species in this genus:
 Vinagarra elongata V. H. Nguyễn & T. A. Bùi, 2010
 Vinagarra findolabium (F. L. Li, W. Zhou & Q. Fu, 2008)
 Vinagarra laichowensis (V. H. Nguyễn & L. H. Doan, 1969)
 Vinagarra tamduongensis V. H. Nguyễn & T. A. Bùi, 2010

References

 
Freshwater fish of Asia
Cyprinidae genera